Charles Baker (5 October 174319 February 1835) was born in Virginia, and was a surveyor in Canada as his first recorded profession.

Baker was in Nova Scotia in 1765 as a deputy surveyor in the Chignecto region. After the American Revolution, he was active in the surveys which settled loyalists. In 1788 he settled in Amherst Township on an  land grant he had received. There he became a justice of the peace and a clerk of the courts and by 1802 was a judge.

History records him as being a good magistrate and public servant. Through his various activities, he contributed significantly to the settlement and development of the areas where he lived.

External links
 Biography at the Dictionary of Canadian Biography Online

1743 births
1835 deaths
People from Cumberland County, Nova Scotia
Virginia colonial people
British emigrants to pre-Confederation Nova Scotia
American surveyors
British surveyors
Canadian surveyors
Canadian people of English descent
Colony of Nova Scotia judges